Herath is a Sinhalese surname. Notable people with the surname include:

 Charitha Herath, Sri Lankan academic
 Chatura Herath (born 1987), Sri Lankan cricketer
 Cyril Herath, Sri Lankan police officer
 D. B. Herath (born 1956), Sri Lankan politician
 Harold Herath (died 2007), Sri Lankan politician
 Jayarathna Herath, Sri Lankan politician
 Kanaka Herath, Sri Lankan politician
 Maheepala Herath, Sri Lankan politician
 Rangana Herath (born 1978), Sri Lankan cricketer
 Renuka Herath, Sri Lankan politician
 Samanpriya Herath (born 1976), Sri Lankan politician
 Samansiri Herath, Sri Lankan politician
 Vijitha Herath (born 1968), Sri Lankan politician

See also
 

Sinhalese surnames